Mordellistena flaviceps is a beetle in the genus Mordellistena of the family Mordellidae. It was described in 1863 by Victor Ivanovitsch Motschulsky.

References

flaviceps
Beetles described in 1863